Gemma Tattersall (born 12 March 1985) is a British Olympic eventing rider. She competed at the 2016 Summer Olympics in Rio de Janeiro where she finished 41st in the individual and 5th in the team competition.

Tattersall also participated at the 2015 European Eventing Championships, finishing 9th in the individual event. Gemma has previously been part of the junior and young rider European Championship squads. She was reserve for Great Britain at the World Equestrian Games with and Arctic Soul in 2014.
Tattersall was listed in the Spear's 500 in the Equine Category.

Tattersall was one of 130 athletes selected as part of the Ambition programme to attend the London Olympics in order to prepare those with potential to represent Britain at a future Games.

CCI 5* performance
She won the only CCI 5* event hosted in 2021, the Bicton Arena International 5*, on Chilli Knight. She finished less than a point in front of second place Pippa Funnell, and six points clear of third placed Piggy March.

Results

References

External links

Living people
1985 births
British female equestrians
Equestrians at the 2016 Summer Olympics
Olympic equestrians of Great Britain